Forbes is a hamlet by Tullynessle in Aberdeenshire, Scotland.

It is connected to Tullynessle 1 3/4 miles from Alford.

See also
Clan Forbes

References

Hamlets in Scotland
Villages in Aberdeenshire